Neville George Perkins OAM, (born 4 January 1952), is a former Australian politician and public servant.

Early life
Perkins is the grandson of Hetty Perkins, an Eastern Arrernte elder, and a nephew of Charlie Perkins. He is a descendant of both the Eastern and Central Arrernte peoples, and was born in Mbantua, Alice Springs. He attended Newington College (1963–1969), commencing in the preparatory school, Wyvern House. He is a graduate of the University of Sydney.

Career

|}
Perkins was a Labor Party member of the Northern Territory Legislative Assembly from 1977 to 1981, representing the electorate of MacDonnell. He was the first Indigenous Australian to hold a shadow ministry in an Australian parliament, and subsequently became the party's deputy leader.

Perkins resigned in 1981, not long into his second term. He later served as Secretary of the New South Wales Department of Aboriginal Affairs from 1987 to 1988.

In 1973 he founded and was the first general secretary of the Central Australian Aboriginal Congress (CAAC). Around the same time, he and a group of others set up the Central Australian Aboriginal Legal Aid Service (CAALAS; later amalgamated with other services to form the North Australian Aboriginal Justice Agency).

He was also the first Aboriginal general manager of Aboriginal Hostels Limited, and the first Aboriginal general manager of Imparja Television Pty Ltd. He is a Fellow of the Australian Institute of Management. Following Imparja, he was director of the University of New South Wales' Aboriginal Education Program. He has since worked at National Indigenous Television (NITV).

Honours
 Medal of the Order of Australia (OAM) for service to Aboriginal welfare, 26 January 1984.

References

1952 births
Australian Labor Party members of the Northern Territory Legislative Assembly
Indigenous Australian politicians
Members of the Northern Territory Legislative Assembly
People educated at Newington College
Recipients of the Medal of the Order of Australia
Living people
Fellows of the Australian Institute of Management
University of Sydney alumni